Danilo Pilica (born 1 September 1992) is a Serbian footballer who plays for Austrian club ATSV Salzburg. Pilica mainly plays centre and right-back, but he can also play as a defensive midfielder in some occasions.

Club career
Born in Priboj, Pilica passed FK Partizan youth categories, and made his first senior appearances playing with satellite club Teleoptik in the Serbian First League between 2010 and 2011. In summer 2011, Pilica joined Slavija Sarajevo, but after he made just one appearance in the Premier League of Bosnia and Herzegovina, he left the club at the beginning of next year. In 2013, Pilica moved back to Serbian side joining FK Kolubara. He preliminary signed with OFK Beograd at the beginning of 2014, but already stayed with Kolubara, scoring 4 goals on 22 matches in the Serbian League Belgrade for the 2013–14 season. In summer 2015, Pilica permanently moved to Zlatibor Čajetina, along with teammate Miloš Nenadović, scoring a goal on a debut match for new club, against Zadrugar Lajkovac. Beside games in the Drina Zone League, Pilica also played an OFS Užice cup match against FK Čajetina. In the winter break off-season, Pilica returned to Kolubara, making 8 appearances with 1 goal for the rest of season in the Serbian First League. In the last fixture match of the 2015–16 Serbian First League season, against Radnički Kragujevac, Pilica was substituted out from the field during the first-half. Due to anterior cruciate ligament injury he earned on that match, he missed the greatest part of the next season. He returned in the first-team squad for the 23 fixture match of the 2015–16 Serbian First League season, played on 23 April 2017 against Proleter Novi Sad, when he was also substituted out during the first-half.

International career
In December 2009, Pilica was called-up into the [[Serbia national under-18 football team]|Serbia u18 team]] under coach Aleksandar Stanojević for the tournament at Tel Aviv, where he made his debut for the team in a match against Germany u18. He was called in amateur selection under Football Association of Belgrade in 2014.

Career statistics

References

External links
 
 Danilo Pilica at voetbalzone.nl

1992 births
People from Priboj
Living people
Serbian footballers
Association football defenders
FK Teleoptik players
FK Slavija Sarajevo players
FK FAP players
FK Kolubara players
FK Zlatibor Čajetina players
Serbian First League players
Premier League of Bosnia and Herzegovina players
Serbian SuperLiga players
Serbian expatriate footballers
Expatriate footballers in Bosnia and Herzegovina
Serbian expatriate sportspeople in Bosnia and Herzegovina
Expatriate footballers in Austria
Serbian expatriate sportspeople in Austria